The Infantry Soldier silver dollar is a commemorative coin issued by the United States Mint in 2012.

References

2012 establishments in the United States
Modern United States commemorative coins